The Balsas River or Rio Tucutí' is a river of eastern Panama. 

Geography

The Balsas is a tributary of the Tuira (or Darien) river.
It rises on the border with Colombia and flows north and then northeast to its confluence with the Tuira.
Its headwaters flow through the Darién National Park.
A 1903 report on Panama listed the Balsas as one of the more important rivers of the territory of Darien, then in Panamá Province.
The report said that gold was obtained from the Balsas.

The Köppen climate classification is Tropical Savannah.
It rains on about 150 days each year.
The waters of the Balsa River are more turbid than the waters of the Tuira River, indicating greater amounts of erosion in the Balsa basin.
The mouth of the Balsas River has several islets formed by sediment, some with growth of herbaceous vegetation.

Ecology

The river is also called Rio de balsas, after the balsa trees (Ochroma lagopus) that were found along its bank.
Balsa wood is very light, and is used for rafts. In Spanish, balsa means "raft".

A 1997 study of the middle basin of the river found 40 species of fish in 38 genera and 17 families.
11 species were endemic.

European exploration

Due to poor construction, these boats sank when they reached the Pearl Islands in the Gulf of Panama.
González built four more ships there, and set sail on 21 January 1522.

In 1572 Captain Esteban de Trejo led an expedition to subdue runaway African slaves, and discovered several Indian towns in the process.
He called the inhabitants Churruca Indians after the river than flowed past their towns.
 to the east of the seat of Churruca, beside the Balsas river, he found about 300 Calegra Indians.
They spoke a different language from the Churrucas and prided themselves as being very warlike.

See also
List of rivers of Panama

Notes

References

Sources

 

Rivers of Panama